Born to Win is the debut studio album of Filipino girl group Bini. It was released by Star Music on 14 October 2021. The album contains twelve tracks, with "Golden Arrow" as its carrier single, 5 other new tracks "B HU U R" featuring Kritiko, "Na Na Na", "Kinikilig", "8" and "Here With You", four international versions of the group's debut single in Bahasa, Japanese, Spanish and Thai, along with their trademark songs Born to Win and Kapit Lang. The album's lyrical content celebrates love, positivity and empowerment.

The album debuts and peaks at number 1 on iTunes Albums Chart in the Philippines. It also charted in Thailand and Hong Kong.

Background and release
It was during the official debut of the group on 11 June 2021, when ABS-CBN Entertainment head Laurenti Dyogi made a statement on the upcoming projects of Bini and its brother group BGYO—full-length albums, merch and the "One Dream: The BINI x BGYO Concert". On 28 September 2021, the group's official social media account announced the schedules and the release of the debut album. Tracklist of the album was revealed on 3 October 2021  and audio sampler on 12 October 2021.

Composition

Singles
Born to Win yielded three singles. The debut single, "Born to Win", was released in June 2021. The music video of "Born to Win" has received more than 200,000 YouTube views on its first 24 hours of release, making it the fastest among the debut music videos of any P-pop group. In July 2021, a Maxi single of the track was released which features the Instrumental, Latin, EDM, String Quartet and Acapella versions. In September 2021, the song was played in the preliminary competition and performed in the coronation of the Miss Universe Philippines 2021. "Kapit Lang" was released in September 2021 as the group's third single and released as the album's sixth single. "Golden Arrow" was released in October 2021 as the album's second single and key track.

Track listing
All song credits are adapted from the album sampler released by Bini's label Star Music in YouTube, unless otherwise noted.

Awards and nominations

Release history

References

2021 debut albums
Bini (group) albums
Star Music albums